Downtown Durham Historic District is a national historic district located at Durham, Durham County, North Carolina. The district encompasses 97 contributing buildings and 1 contributing structure in the central business district of Durham. The buildings primarily date from the first four decades of the 20th century and include notable examples of Colonial Revival, Italianate, and Art Deco architecture.  Notable buildings include the St. Philip's Episcopal Church (1907), Trinity Methodist Episcopal Church (1880-1881), First Baptist Church (1926-1927), Durham County Courthouse (1916), Durham Auditorium (Carolina Theatre, 1920s), Tempest Building (1894, 1905), National Guard Armory (1934-1937), United States Post Office (1934), Trust Building (1904), First National Bank Building (1913-1915), Mechanics and Farmers Bank (1921), Johnson Motor Company showroom (1927), Hill Building (1935), Snow Building (1933), and S. H. Kress store.

It was listed on the National Register of Historic Places in 1977.

On August 14, 2017 a 15-foot-high statue of an armed Confederate patriot was torn down in front of the 1916 Durham County Courthouse by demonstrators.  The destruction of the statue followed the 2017 Unite the Right rally in Charlottesville, Virginia where one counter-demonstrator was killed.

References

Historic districts on the National Register of Historic Places in North Carolina
Colonial Revival architecture in North Carolina
Italianate architecture in North Carolina
Art Deco architecture in North Carolina
Historic districts in Durham, North Carolina
National Register of Historic Places in Durham County, North Carolina